Spix's warbling antbird (Hypocnemis striata) is a species of bird in the family Thamnophilidae.

Spix's warbling antbird was described and illustrated by the German naturalist Johann Baptist von Spix in 1825 and given the binomial name Thamnophilus striatus. The current genus Hypocnemis was introduced in 1847.  Until recently, it was considered a subspecies of the Guianan warbling antbird (Hypocnemis cantator), but based on vocal differences and to a lesser degree differences in plumage, it is now treated as separate species.

There are three subspecies:
 Hypocnemis striata implicata Zimmer, JT, 1932 – west central Amazonian Brazil
 Hypocnemis striata striata (von Spix, 1825) – central Amazonian Brazil
 Hypocnemis striata affinis Zimmer, JT, 1932 – east central Amazonian Brazil
The westernmost population is likely to represent an undescribed subspecies. Spix's warbling antbird is found at lower levels in humid forest in the south-eastern Amazon of Brazil.

References

 Zimmer & Isler. 2003. Hypocnemis cantator (Warbling Antbird). Pp. 645 in del Hoyo, Elliott, & Christie. 2003. Handbook of the Birds of the World. Vol. 8. Broadbills to Tapaculos. Lynx Edicions. Barcelona.
 Spix's Warbling Antbird arthurgrosset.com. Accessed June 27, 2008

Spix's warbling antbird
Birds of the Amazon Basin
Spix's warbling antbird